Murosternum pentagonale is a species of beetle in the family Cerambycidae. It was described by Karl Jordan in 1894. It is known from Gabon, Cameroon, the Ivory Coast, the Democratic Republic of the Congo, Benin, and Nigeria. It contains the variety Murosternum pentagonale var. maculatum.

References

Tragocephalini
Beetles described in 1894